The 1956 United States presidential election in Vermont took place on November 6, 1956, as part of the 1956 United States presidential election which was held throughout all contemporary 48 states. Voters chose three representatives, or electors to the Electoral College, who voted for president and vice president.

Vermont voted overwhelmingly for the Republican nominee, incumbent President Dwight D. Eisenhower of Pennsylvania, over the Democratic nominee, former Illinois Governor Adlai Stevenson. Eisenhower ran with incumbent Vice President Richard Nixon of California, while Stevenson's running mate was Senator Estes Kefauver of Tennessee.

Eisenhower took a landslide 72.16% of the vote to Stevenson's 27.81%, a victory margin of 44.35%. This was the most lopsided statewide win of the election.

Vermont historically was a bastion of liberal Northeastern Republicanism, and by 1956 the Green Mountain State had gone Republican in every presidential election since the founding of the Republican Party. From 1856 to 1952, Vermont had had the longest streak of voting Republican of any state, having never voted Democratic before, and this tradition easily continued in 1956 with Eisenhower's landslide win.

Eisenhower, a war hero and moderate Republican who had pledged to reform and maintain popular New Deal Democratic policies, had wide appeal beyond the boundaries of the traditional Republican coalition. While Vermont had been one of the only two states (the other being Maine) in the nation to vote against Franklin Roosevelt all 4 times, the GOP margins in the state had narrowed substantially in the 1930s and 1940s, particularly due to the strong Democratic presence in the northwestern part of the state. However Eisenhower's unique personal appeal brought even that region back into the GOP coalition, and allowed him to break 70% in the state in both 1952 and 1956 (where Eisenhower had performed better than he did in 1952), the first Republican to do so since Calvin Coolidge in 1924, and the last Republican to date.

Eisenhower swept every county in Vermont, breaking 70% in 11 of the 14 counties. The three northwestern counties of Vermont had long been Democratic enclaves in an otherwise Republican state through the 1930s and 1940s, but Eisenhower won them back for the GOP in both 1952 and 1956, in the latter case even breaking 60% in Grand Isle County. The region still remained the most Democratic in the state, as Eisenhower received less than 60% of the vote in Chittenden County and Franklin County, while every county outside the northwest broke seventy percent for Eisenhower. In three counties Eisenhower even broke eighty percent of the vote, which, as of 2020, no other candidate has managed to do since. No presidential candidate since has surpassed Eisenhower's 72.16% vote share or his 44.35% margin of victory, as by the late 1950s cracks were already beginning to form in the Republican stranglehold on Vermont, and the GOP shifted toward an increasingly Southern and conservative party beginning in the 1960s.

Even as Eisenhower won a decisive re-election landslide nationally, Vermont weighed in as a whopping 29% more Republican than the national average, making Vermont the most Republican state in the union in the 1956 election. While Vermont had been the most Republican state in the nation in many elections prior to 1956, this would prove the last election when the Green Mountain State would hold that title. 

This would be the last time Vermont was the strongest state for either party until 64 years later, in 2020, when it was Democratic candidate Joe Biden's strongest state, demonstrating the completion of Vermont's trend towards the Democrats.

Results

Results by county

See also
 United States presidential elections in Vermont

Notes

References

Vermont
1956
1956 Vermont elections